The 59th Ariel Awards ceremony, organized by the Mexican Academy of Film Arts and Sciences (AMACC) took place on July 11, 2017, at the Palacio de Bellas Artes in Mexico City. During the ceremony, AMACC presented the Ariel Award in 27 categories honoring films released in 2016. The ceremony will be televised in Mexico by Canal 22.

La 4ª Compañía was the most awarded film with 10 awards including Best Picture. Tatiana Huezo became the first female director to receive the Best Director award, for the documentary feature Tempestad, which also received three awards. Almacenados received three accolades, for Best Actor, Supporting Actor, and Adapted Screenplay; while La Caridad earned two awards for Best Actress and Best Supporting Actress. Art designer Lucero Isaac and actress Isela Vega received the Golden Ariel for their outstanding artistic career.

Background
The Mexican Academy of Film Arts and Sciences (AMAAC) announced that films released in Mexico from January 1 through September 30 should register online for award consideration at the Ariel Awards' official website during the month of October 2016; films released from October 1 to December 31, could register at the same website from December 2016 to January 15, 2017. It was also revealed that the Academy reinstated for the 59th ceremony two former categories, Actor and Actress in a Minor Role, that will be awarded to a performer that "has a smaller participation than a lead protagonist or a co-star and is not the narrative focus but their performance is relevant to the plot. Their performance can be limited to a single sequence."

At the press conference held on May 3, 2017 to announce the 2017 Ariel Award nominees, AMAAC Secretary Everardo González informed that 131 films were submitted for consideration, including 11 animated short films, 10 documentary short subject films, 45 live action short films, 18 documentary features, 37 feature films, and 10 Iberoamerican feature films. He also announced that the award ceremony would be held at the Palacio de Bellas Artes in Mexico City, and will be dedicated to cinematography in order to celebrate the 70th anniversary of the first Ariel Awards. This year the nominees were selected by 174 Academy members.

Actors Karina Gidi and Juan Carlos Colombo announced the nominees which included two documentary features nominated for Best Picture, Bellas de Noche, directed by María José Cuevas and Tempestad, by Tatiana Huezo, with both films also being nominated for Best Documentary Feature. La 4ª Compañía is the most nominated film, with 20 nominations, including Best Picture, Best Director, Best First Feature Film, and seven acting nominations in the Best Actor, Best Supporting Actor and Actor in a Minor Role, categories. Art director Lucero Isaac and Mexican actress Isela Vega will received the Golden Ariel to recognize their artistic career.

On June 22, 2017, the President of the AMACC, Dolores Heredia, announced that the award ceremony would go on despite a 77% cut to the academy's budget. "Let us make use of our imagination and creativity to have a dignified and solemn ceremony," Heredia declared. The ceremony will be produced by actor Daniel Giménez Cacho and televised by Canal 22, since the academy had several problems with Canal Once the previous year.

Awards
The following list includes nominees and winners which are first and highlighted with boldface.

Multiple nominations and awards

The following films received multiple nominations:

Films that received multiple awards:

References

Ariel Awards ceremonies
2017 film awards
Ariel
July 2017 events in Mexico